Sky Witness was a ruler of the Maya city and major cultural center of Calakmul, also known as Kaan.

He took the rulership some time prior to the year 561, and led Kaan into a war with rival Maya city-state Tikal (also known as Mutal), winning a major victory in 562 which broke Mutal's formerly extensive power in the southern Yucatán Peninsula for some decades.

References 

Kings of Calakmul
6th century in the Maya civilization
6th-century monarchs in North America